The Netherlands Football League Championship 1933–1934 was contested by 50 teams participating in five divisions. The national champion would be determined by a play-off featuring the winners of the eastern, northern, southern and two western football divisions of the Netherlands. AFC Ajax won this year's championship by beating KFC, Willem II, Heracles and Velocitas 1897.

New entrants
Eerste Klasse East:
Promoted from 2nd Division: HVV Hengelo
Eerste Klasse West-I:
Moving in from West-II: AFC Ajax, HFC Haarlem and Sparta Rotterdam
Promoted from 2nd Division: Koninklijke HFC
Eerste Klasse West-II:
Moving in from West-I: DHC Delft, HBS Craeyenhout and RCH
Promoted from 2nd Division: SBV Excelsior

Divisions

Eerste Klasse East

Eerste Klasse North

Eerste Klasse South

Eerste Klasse West-I

Eerste Klasse West-II

Championship play-off

Tie-break play-off

References
RSSSF Netherlands Football League Championships 1898-1954
RSSSF Eerste Klasse Oost
RSSSF Eerste Klasse Noord
RSSSF Eerste Klasse Zuid
RSSSF Eerste Klasse West

Netherlands Football League Championship seasons
Neth
Neth